Valter Drandić (born August 7, 1956) is a Croatian politician,  member of the Istria County Assembly and a member of the European Committee of the Regions. He was in the Sabor for two terms from February 2000 to December 2003 and from December 2003 to January 2008.

He graduated from technical school and studied economics and tourism in University of Rijeka. He passed the professional exams for the expert associate for informatics and for the organizer of automatic data processing at the Republic Committee for Science, Technology and Informatics in Zagreb.

He was elected a member of the Istrian County Assembly six times (1993, 1997, 2009, 2013, 2017 and 2021), and in 2013 and 2017 he was elected President of the Assembly. By decision of the Croatian Government, on December 11, 2019 he was appointed member of the European Committee in the region mandate 2020th to 2025th. From 1996 to 2000 he served as vice president of the County of Istria.

In 1997, he was elected a member of the County House of the Croatian National Parliament. From 2000 to 2008, he was elected to the Croatian Parliament for two terms, where he served as President of the Tourism Committee and President of the Executive Board of the National Group of the Croatian Parliament at the Inter-Parliamentary Union. He was also a member of the National Committee for Monitoring the Process of Croatia's accession to the European Union, the Croatian Parliament Delegation to the Croatian-EU Joint Parliamentary Committee, the Committee for European Integration and the Committee for Interparliamentary Cooperation and the President of the Croatian-Italian Friendship Group.

He was Mayor of the City of Pula-Pola from June 2005 to June 2006.

He has been a member of the Presidency of the Istrian Democratic Assembly (IDS) from 2013 to 2021, where he also served as President of the City Branch of IDS Pula (1995-1997 and 2002–2006), Vice President of IDS (1997-1999 and 2006–2010), Secretary General of the IDS (1999-2002) and President of the Council of the IDS (2002-2006).

From 2001 to 2005 he was Deputy President of the Croatian Fire Department Union (Hrvatska vatrogasna zajednica), from 2005 to 2013 Vice-President of the Croatian Fire Department Union, and since 2013 member of the Presidency of the Croatian Fire Department Union.

He is the holder of the decoration of the President of the Italian Republic "Ufficiale dell'Ordine della Stella d'Italia" (Officer of the Order of the Star of Italy), the Fire Decoration for Special Merits of the Hrvatska vatrogasna zajednica, and the Homeland War Memorial Medal of the Republic of Croatia. Drandić and his party well behaved and showed friendliness towards the Italian of Istria, where today many municipalities have bilingual statutes, signboards are bilingual, and the Italian language is considered to be a co-official language.

References

Istrian Democratic Assembly politicians

1956 births
Living people